This is a list of notable numbers and articles about notable numbers. The list does not contain all numbers in existence as most of the number sets are infinite. Numbers may be included in the list based on their mathematical, historical or cultural notability, but all numbers have qualities which could arguably make them notable. Even the smallest "uninteresting" number is paradoxically interesting for that very property. This is known as the interesting number paradox.

The definition of what is classed as a number is rather diffuse and based on historical distinctions. For example, the pair of numbers (3,4) is commonly regarded as a number when it is in the form of a complex number (3+4i), but not when it is in the form of a vector (3,4). This list will also be categorised with the standard convention of types of numbers.

This list focuses on numbers as mathematical objects and is not a list of numerals, which are linguistic devices: nouns, adjectives, or adverbs that designate numbers. The distinction is drawn between the number five (an abstract object equal to 2+3),  and the numeral five (the noun referring to the number).

Natural numbers 

The natural numbers are a subset of the integers and are of historical and pedagogical value as they can be used for counting and often have ethno-cultural significance (see below). Beyond this, natural numbers are widely used as a building block for other number systems including the integers, rational numbers and real numbers. Natural numbers are those used for counting (as in "there are six (6) coins on the table") and ordering (as in "this is the third (3rd) largest city in the country").  In common language, words used for counting are "cardinal numbers" and words used for ordering are "ordinal numbers". Defined by the Peano axioms, the natural numbers form an infinitely large set. Often referred to as "the naturals", the natural numbers are usually symbolised by a boldface  (or blackboard bold , Unicode ).

The inclusion of 0 in the set of natural numbers is ambiguous and subject to individual definitions. In set theory and computer science, 0 is typically considered a natural number. In number theory, it usually is not. The ambiguity can be solved with the terms  "non-negative integers", which includes 0, and "positive integers", which does not.

Natural numbers may be used as cardinal numbers, which may go by various names. Natural numbers may also be used as ordinal numbers.

Mathematical significance 
Natural numbers may have properties specific to the individual number or may be part of a set (such as prime numbers) of numbers with a particular property.

Cultural or practical significance 
Along with their mathematical properties, many integers have cultural significance or are also notable for their use in computing and measurement. As mathematical properties (such as divisibility) can confer practical utility, there may be interplay and connections between the cultural or practical significance of an integer and its mathematical properties.

Classes of natural numbers 
Subsets of the natural numbers, such as the prime numbers, may be grouped into sets, for instance based on the divisibility of their members. Infinitely many such sets are possible. A list of notable classes of natural numbers may be found at classes of natural numbers.

Prime numbers 

A prime number is a positive integer which has exactly two divisors: 1 and itself.

The first 100 prime numbers are:

Highly composite numbers 

A highly composite number (HCN) is a positive integer with more divisors than any smaller positive integer. They are often used in geometry, grouping and time measurement.

The first 20 highly composite numbers are:

1, 2, 4, 6, 12, 24, 36, 48, 60, 120, 180, 240, 360, 720, 840, 1260, 1680, 2520, 5040, 7560

Perfect numbers 

A perfect number is an integer that is the sum of its positive proper divisors (all divisors except itself).

The first 10 perfect numbers:

Integers 

The integers are a set of numbers commonly encountered in arithmetic and number theory. There are many subsets of the integers, including the natural numbers, prime numbers, perfect numbers, etc. Many integers are notable for their mathematical properties. Integers are usually symbolised by a boldface  (or blackboard bold , Unicode ); this became the symbol for the integers based on the German word for "numbers" (Zahlen).

Notable integers include −1, the additive inverse of unity, and 0, the additive identity.

As with the natural numbers, the integers may also have cultural or practical significance. For instance, −40 is the equal point in the Fahrenheit and Celsius scales.

SI prefixes 
One important use of integers is in orders of magnitude. A power of 10 is a number 10k, where k is an integer. For instance, with k = 0, 1, 2, 3, ..., the appropriate powers of ten are 1, 10, 100, 1000, ... Powers of ten can also be fractional: for instance, k = -3 gives 1/1000, or 0.001. This is used in scientific notation, real numbers are written in the form m × 10n. The number 394,000 is written in this form as 3.94 × 105.

Integers are used as prefixes in the SI system. A metric prefix is a unit prefix that precedes a basic unit of measure to indicate a multiple or fraction of the unit. Each prefix has a unique symbol that is prepended to the unit symbol. The prefix kilo-, for example, may be added to gram to indicate multiplication by one thousand: one kilogram is equal to one thousand grams. The prefix milli-, likewise, may be added to metre to indicate division by one thousand; one millimetre is equal to one thousandth of a metre.

Rational numbers 

A rational number is any number that can be expressed as the quotient or fraction  of two integers, a numerator  and a non-zero denominator . Since  may be equal to 1, every integer is trivially a rational number. The set of all rational numbers, often referred to as "the rationals",  the field of rationals or the field of rational numbers is usually denoted by a boldface  (or blackboard bold , Unicode ); it was thus denoted in 1895 by Giuseppe Peano after quoziente, Italian for "quotient".

Rational numbers such as 0.12 can be represented in infinitely many ways, e.g. zero-point-one-two (0.12), three twenty-fifths, nine seventy-fifths, etc. This can be mitigated by representing rational numbers in a canonical form as an irreducible fraction.

A list of rational numbers is shown below. The names of fractions can be found at numeral (linguistics).

Irrational numbers
The irrational numbers are a set of numbers that includes all real numbers that are not rational numbers. The irrational numbers are categorised as algebraic numbers (which are the root of a polynomial with rational coefficients) or transcendental numbers, which are not.

Algebraic numbers

Transcendental numbers

Irrational but not known to be transcendental
Some numbers are known to be irrational numbers, but have not been proven to be transcendental. This differs from the algebraic numbers, which are known not to be transcendental.

Real numbers 

The real numbers are a superset containing the algebraic and the transcendental numbers. The real numbers, sometimes referred to as "the reals", are usually symbolised by a boldface  (or blackboard bold , Unicode ). For some numbers, it is not known whether they are algebraic or transcendental. The following list includes real numbers that have not been proved to be irrational, nor transcendental.

Real but not known to be irrational, nor transcendental

Numbers not known with high precision 

Some real numbers, including transcendental numbers, are not known with high precision.

 The constant in the Berry–Esseen Theorem: 0.4097 < C < 0.4748
 De Bruijn–Newman constant: 0 ≤ Λ ≤ 0.2
 Chaitin's constants Ω, which are transcendental and provably impossible to compute.
 Bloch's constant (also 2nd Landau's constant): 0.4332 < B < 0.4719
 1st Landau's constant: 0.5 < L < 0.5433
 3rd Landau's constant: 0.5 < A ≤ 0.7853
 Grothendieck constant: 1.67 < k < 1.79
 Romanov's constant in Romanov's theorem: 0.107648 < d < 0.49094093, Romanov conjectured that it is 0.434

Hypercomplex numbers 

Hypercomplex number is a term for an element of a unital algebra over the field of real numbers. The complex numbers are often symbolised by a boldface  (or blackboard bold , Unicode ), while the set of quaternions is denoted by a boldface  (or blackboard bold , Unicode ).

Algebraic complex numbers 
 Imaginary unit: 
 nth roots of unity: , while , GCD(k, n) = 1

Other hypercomplex numbers
 The quaternions
 The octonions
 The sedenions
 The dual numbers (with an infinitesimal)

Transfinite numbers 

Transfinite numbers are numbers that are "infinite" in the sense that they are larger than all finite numbers, yet not necessarily absolutely infinite.
 Aleph-one: א: the cardinality of ω1, the set of all countable ordinal numbers
 Beth-one: ב the cardinality of the continuum 2
 ℭ or : the cardinality of the continuum 2
 Omega: ω, the smallest infinite ordinal

Numbers representing physical quantities 

Physical quantities that appear in the universe are often described using physical constants.
 Avogadro constant: 
 Electron mass: 
 Fine-structure constant: 
 Gravitational constant: 
 Molar mass constant: 
 Planck constant: 
 Rydberg constant: 
 Speed of light in vacuum: 
 Vacuum electric permittivity:

Numbers representing geographical and astronomical distances 
 , the average equatorial radius of Earth in kilometers (following GRS 80 and WGS 84 standards).
 , the length of the Equator in kilometers (following GRS 80 and WGS 84 standards).
 , the semi-major axis of the orbit of the Moon, in kilometers, roughly the distance between the center of Earth and that of the Moon.
 , the average distance between the Earth and the Sun or Astronomical Unit (AU), in meters.
 , one light-year, the distance travelled by light in one Julian year, in meters.
 , the distance of one parsec, another astronomical unit, in whole meters.

Numbers without specific values 

Many languages have words expressing indefinite and fictitious numbers—inexact terms of indefinite size, used for comic effect, for exaggeration, as placeholder names, or when precision is unnecessary or undesirable. One technical term for such words is "non-numerical vague quantifier". Such words designed to indicate large quantities can be called "indefinite hyperbolic numerals".

Named numbers 
Eddington number, ~1080
Googol, 10100
Googolplex, 10(10100)
Graham's number
Hardy–Ramanujan number, 1729
Kaprekar's constant, 6174
Moser's number
Rayo's number
Shannon number
Skewes's number
TREE(3)

See also 

 Absolute Infinite
 English numerals
 Floating-point arithmetic
 Fraction
 Integer sequence
 Interesting number paradox
 Large numbers
 List of mathematical constants
 List of prime numbers
 List of types of numbers
 Mathematical constant
 Metric prefix
 Names of large numbers
 Names of small numbers
 Negative number
 Numeral (linguistics)
 Numeral prefix
 Order of magnitude
 Orders of magnitude (numbers)
 Ordinal number
 The Penguin Dictionary of Curious and Interesting Numbers
 Power of two
 Power of 10
 Surreal number
 Table of prime factors

References 

 
.

Further reading 
 Kingdom of Infinite Number: A Field Guide by Bryan Bunch, W.H. Freeman & Company, 2001.

External links 
 The Database of Number Correlations: 1 to 2000+
 What's Special About This Number? A Zoology of Numbers: from 0 to 500
 Name of a Number
 See how to write big numbers
 
 Robert P. Munafo's Large Numbers page
 Different notations for big numbers – by Susan Stepney
 Names for Large Numbers, in How Many? A Dictionary of Units of Measurement by Russ Rowlett
 What's Special About This Number? (from 0 to 9999)

 
Mathematical tables